Martin Phong Ni Watt Breunig (born 18 February 1992) is a German professional basketball player for Mitteldeutscher BC of the Basketball Bundesliga.

Amateur career 
Breunig, son of a Thai mother and a German father, played football before he came to basketball. In the U14, he joined the youth section of the 04 Leverkusen TSV Bayer. He played for his hometown club until 2010, including on the side of Mathis Mönninghoff, Tim Unterluggauer and Till-Joscha Jönke in the U19 Bundesliga NBBL. He decided to continue his career in the United States. In the 2010–11 season Breunig joined St. John's Northwestern Military Academy in Delafield, Wisconsin and then moved to the University of Washington, where he studied and played from 2011 to 2013. Then he transferred to Montana, sitting out the 2013–14 season per NCAA rules.

While Breunig was a bench player at Washington, he became a star player at Montana. He was named to the First Team All-Big Sky Conference as a junior and was the sixth highest scorer in the Big Sky Conference, averaging 16.7 points per-game. He was the highest scoring two-year player in Montana history. Breunig was named team MVP and repeated on the First Team All-Big Sky as a senior.

Professional career
Breunig started his professional career by signing in June 2016, a two-year contract with the Bundesliga club MHP Riesen Ludwigsburg. However, this contract was dissolved after just one year, Breunig moved within the league to the Telekom Baskets Bonn. During the 2019–20 season, he averaged 11.3 points and 5.6 rebounds per game. On July 20, 2020, he has signed with EWE Baskets Oldenburg of the Basketball Bundesliga (BBL).

On September 5, 2022, he signed with Mitteldeutscher BC of the Basketball Bundesliga.

National team 
Breunig played for the German U16 and U18 national team. With the U16 he won the B Championships in Sarajevo in 2008.  In 2010, he took part in the U18 selection at the European Championships in Lithuania.

Statistics

References

External links
 Basketball Champions League Profile
 
 ESPN Profile
 Eurobasket.com Profile
 Montana Grizzlies bio
 College stats @ Basketball-reference.com

1992 births
Living people
Centers (basketball)
EWE Baskets Oldenburg players
German expatriate basketball people in the United States
German men's basketball players
German people of Thai descent
Mitteldeutscher BC players
Montana Grizzlies basketball players
Sportspeople from Leverkusen
Power forwards (basketball)
Riesen Ludwigsburg players
Telekom Baskets Bonn players
Washington Huskies men's basketball players